Luigi Accogli (16 August 1917 – 21 June 2004) was an Italian prelate of the Catholic Church who spent his career in the diplomatic service of the Holy See, including stints as Apostolic Nuncio in China, Ecuador, Bangladesh, and Syria.

Biography
Luigi Accogli was born in Andrano in the Province of Lecce on 16 August 1917. He was ordained a priest on 6 March 1943. To prepare for a diplomatic career he entered the Pontifical Ecclesiastical Academy in 1946.

On 19 October 1967, Pope Paul VI named him a titular archbishop and Apostolic Nuncio to China. He received his episcopal consecration from Cardinal Amleto Cicognani on 26 November 1967.

On 29 September 1970, Pope Paul VI appointed him Apostolic Nuncio to Ecuador. On 6 July 1979, Pope John Paul II named him Apostolic Nuncio to Bangladesh. On 17 June 1988, Pope John Paul named him Apostolic Nuncio to Syria.

He retired when he was replaced in that position on 11 February 1993.

He died on 21 June 2004.

References

External links
Catholic Hierarchy: Archbishop Luigi Accogli 

1917 births
2004 deaths
Pontifical Ecclesiastical Academy alumni
Apostolic Nuncios to Syria
Apostolic Nuncios to Ecuador
Apostolic Nuncios to Bangladesh
People from the Province of Udine